Chanda Singh Wala is a village in Kasur District in the Punjab province of Pakistan. Word 'wala' means 'of' in English. It is located at 31°5'0N 74°37'0E with an altitude of 195 metres (643 feet). It is said that Before the Partition it was a Sikh Village But During the 1947 Partition They Migrated to East Punjab India.

References

Populated places in Kasur District